Ann Kocsis ( 1910 - 1972) was an American still-life painter.

Early life and education 
Kocsis born in New York City to Hungarian immigrants John and Katie Svidro. At the age of five, sometime between 1910 and 1920, her family moved to Pittsburgh. After leaving her formal education at the age of 15, she worked for a time as an apprentice for a millinery designer, and at 17 began working at a beauty parlor. That work, combined with teaching private piano and art lessons, enabled her to pay tuition at the Wickersham School of Music and the Art Institute of Pittsburgh.

Career 

At some point, Kocsis returned to New York, where she began to focus on painting. After taking classes at the National Academy of Design, in 1939 and 1941 she held solo shows at the Montross Gallery, which was managed by her acquaintance, Philip Reilly. A New York Times review of the 1939 show noted her fastidious style, saying that the work was “all very earnest… carrying with it a distinct sense of subjects being very carefully studied and color and arrangement being very painstakingly thought out,” and suggesting that it could have benefitted from a less controlled approach. A review by the same writer of the 1941 show was more complimentary, noting that Kocsis' work was “high in key, sound in construction and brushed with assurance and determination,” mentioning in particular the paintings World's Fair at Night, Cleaning Up, Grapes and Cabbage and Palette and Brushes. The last won honorable mention in Seton Hall University's 1958 Fourth Annual Spring Art Exhibition. While the Montross shows appear to have been Kocsis’ only solo exhibitions, she participated in as many as 50 group exhibitions over the course of her career. These group shows were primarily in New York and the United States, but at least two were international.

Kocsis was a member of many professional organizations, including the Knickerbocker Artists, the International Institute of Arts and Letters, the American Artists Professional League, the National Association of Women Artists, the National Arts Club, and the Royal Society of Arts. Through these organizations and their group shows, Kocsis won several awards and is listed in several bibliographic resources such as Who’s Who 1947 and 1973. Her archive is kept at the Betty Boyd Dettre Library and Research Center at the National Museum of Women in the Arts.

References

Other resources for research 

 Ann Kocsis vertical file, Horticultural Hall, Museum of Fine Arts, Boston Library 
 Ann Kocsis vertical file, Ingalls Library, Cleveland Museum of Art
 Ann Kocsis vertical file, Frick Art Reference Library, The Frick Collection
 Recent paintings by Ann Kocsis (Montross Gallery:1941)
 Exhibitions in New York. (1941). Parnassus, 13(1), 47-48. 
 McCausland, E. (1939). Gallery Index. Parnassus, 11(1), 45-51.

1972 deaths
Still life painters
Artists from New York City
Year of birth uncertain
American women painters